Kavak (also: Kavakköy) is a village in the İskilip District of Çorum Province in Turkey. Its population is 68 (2022).

References

Villages in İskilip District